The Cross of Valour may refer to one of a number of decorations:

 Cross for Military Valour, a French military award
 Cross of Valour (Australia), Australia's highest civil award
 Cross of Valour (Canada), Canada's highest civil award
 Cross of Valour (Greece), Greece's highest civil award
 Cross of Valour (Papua New Guinea), awarded for selfless acts of bravery in times of extreme personal danger
 Cross of Valour (Poland), a Polish military decoration
 Valour Cross, Denmark's highest military award

See also 
 CV (disambiguation)